The  is a division of the University of Tokyo, Japan dedicated to the study of particle physics. The ICEPP is located on the 10th floor of the Faculty of Science Building #1 at the University of Tokyo.

External links 
 http://www.icepp.s.u-tokyo.ac.jp/icepp-e.html

University departments in Japan
University of Tokyo